A. Kunjukrishnan (1912–1975), popularly known as Kalangara Kunjukrishnan was a political leader who was a member of Kerala Legislative Assembly. He represented the Karunagappalli constituency in the first Kerala Legislative Assembly as a congress representative. He worked as a lawyer at Kollam and was a Member of Travancore Devaswom Board.

References

1912 births
1975 deaths
Kerala MLAs 1957–1959